Roberto Ferruzzi (16 December 1853 – 16 February 1934)  was an Italian artist. He is best known for the painting Madonnina that won the second Venice Biennale in 1897.

Biography 

Roberto Ferruzzi was born in Sebenico in Dalmatia (today Šibenik, Croatia) in 1853 to Italian parents. At the age of four he moved to Venice with his family. After the death of his father, a lawyer, he returned to Dalmatia to study classics. In 1868, he returned to Venice to enroll in the Liceo Marco Foscarini. He subsequently entered the University of Padua, and graduated with a law degree, however instead of practicing law he gained vocation as a self-taught painter.

Afterwards, he moved to Luvigliano, a frazione of Torreglia, where he painted Madonnina in 1897.

Ferruzzi exhibited his work for the first time in 1883 in Turin, consisting mostly of figure paintings. In 1887, he exhibited a canvas in Venice titled La prima penitenza, a genre painting of a boy praying a rosary in penance for bad behavior, whilst his grandmother looks on amused. In 1891-1892 at the Palermo exposition his genre painting Hush! won an award. In 1897, he exhibited the Madonnina and Toward the Light in Venice.

Ferruzzi died on 16 February 1934 in Venice and was buried in the small cemetery of Luvigliano in his family's plot, near his wife Ester Sorgato and his daughter Mariska.

He bore two descendants of the same name: his son Roberto (nicknamed Bobo), a painter of lagoons; and his grandson Roberto (nicknamed Robi), an art appraiser and antiquarian.

References

External links

 Article (in Italian) about the Madonnina with picture

÷

1853 births
1934 deaths
Dalmatian Italians
People from Šibenik
19th-century Italian painters
19th-century Italian male artists
Italian male painters
20th-century Italian painters
20th-century Italian male artists